Kelmscott Station is a railway station on the South Western Railway 25.9 kilometres from Perth Station in the suburb of Kelmscott. It is served by Armadale Line services which are part of the Transperth network.

History

Kelmscott station opened on 2 May 1893 as one of the original stations on the Armadale Line. On 2 July 1980, a bus interchange opened on the platform.

In 2008, the Public Transport Authority completed a $10.8 million upgrade of the station.

Services
Kelmscott station is served by Transperth Armadale Line services. Until April 1992, it was served by [[Transwa Australind|The Australind]].

The station saw 496,711 passengers in the 2013-14 financial year.

Platforms

Bus routes

References

External links

Gallery History of Western Australian Railways & Stations

Armadale and Thornlie lines
Railway stations in Perth, Western Australia
Railway stations in Australia opened in 1889
Bus stations in Perth, Western Australia